Jean-Claude Chavigny (born 3 July 1952) is a French weightlifter. He competed at the 1976 Summer Olympics and the 1980 Summer Olympics.

References

External links
 

1952 births
Living people
French male weightlifters
Olympic weightlifters of France
Weightlifters at the 1976 Summer Olympics
Weightlifters at the 1980 Summer Olympics
Sportspeople from Orléans